Cape Tobin ("that which one burns oneself on") is a cape located in the northeast of Sermersooq, Greenland. It is located near the settlement of Ittoqqortoormiit, where short trips and long hauls provide access to the cape. Cape Tobin is located opposite Cape Brewster (Kangikajik).

References

Tobin